The Museum Domain Management Association (MuseDoma) was created in 2000 by the International Council of Museums (ICOM) and the J. Paul Getty Trust. MuseDoma is the sponsoring organization for the  top-level domain.

History 

MuseDoma was created in 2000 as a non-profit trade association based in Delaware.

In October 2001, the ICANN and the Museum Domain Management Association launched the ICANN's first ever sponsored top-level domain, . The new top-level domain was reserved to official museums worldwide. Upon the launch of the tld, the J. Paul Getty Trust was a member of MuseDoma's board.

At the very beginning, the name Museum Domain Management Association was shortened to its initials, MDMA, until the management team was advised to change it since it was exactly the same initials as the homonymous drug (MDMA).

Description 

The  top-level domain is not available for all museums, a list of conditions (non-profit, permanent activity, ...) must be met. Many virtual museums cannot apply for a  domain name.

See also 
 Cary Karp

References

External links 
 MuseDoma .museum registry
 About .museum
 Index of names in .museum
 ICOM
 The Getty Trust

Organizations established in 2000
Museum organizations
Domain name registries
International Council of Museums